Deng Li (born May 1965) is a Chinese diplomat currently serving as vice-minister of Foreign Affairs since October 2021. He previously served as the Chinese Ambassador to Turkey. He is married and has one daughter.

References 

Living people
1965 births
Ambassadors of China to Turkey
Chinese Communist Party politicians from Fujian
21st-century Chinese politicians